Sangamesh Saundattimath (born 1 April 1943) is a Kannada linguist. His other areas of books include Kannada research, critics, literature.

Career
He has served as a professor of Kannada at Karnatak University Dharwad, Gulbarga University, for over 33 years and after retirement, he was selected as emeritus professor by U.G.C. He was holding a number of administrative positions at the time of his service such as dean of Faculty of Arts, chairman of the Institute of Kannada studies (Gulbarga University), student welfare officer (Gulbarga University), special officer (P.G. Centre, Raichur) etc. He is also currently working as a resource person in Central Institute of Indian Languages.

References

External links 
 http://www.hindu.com/2010/10/31/stories/2010103161500400.htm

20th-century Indian linguists
Living people
Academic staff of Karnatak University
1943 births
Kannada-language writers
Writers from Karnataka